is a Japanese music producer, musician, remixer, DJ.

Discography

Singles

Albums

References

External links 
 
 Ram Rider's page on the Rhythm Zone website

Living people
Avex Group artists
Year of birth missing (living people)